Betty Gloria Miller (July 27, 1934 – December 3, 2012), also known as Bettigee (which was her signature on her artworks) was an American artist who became known as the "Mother of De'VIA" (Deaf View/Image Art).

Family and early life
She was born hard of hearing in Chicago to deaf parents Ralph Reese Miller, Sr., and Gladys Hedrick Miller. She attended an oral school, but learned ASL at home. In June 1976, she earned a Doctor of Education degree (Ed.D.) in art at Pennsylvania State University, becoming the first undergraduate alumna of then-Gallaudet College to earn a doctoral degree. She was also a  Certified Alcohol and Drug Counselor, specializing in working with deaf patients. Her art practice included some of her reflections on a deaf person's experiences in an oral school.

Career 
Miller taught at Gallaudet, her alma mater. Her 1972 work titled Ameslan Prohibited (Ameslan is an early name for American Sign Language) has become a symbol of the oppression deaf people face when signing. This black and white drawing depicts a pair of disembodied hands in handcuffs with the fingers severed at several locations. The original is now part of the National Touring Exhibit of Deaf Culture Art collection.

In 1975, she co-founded Spectrum, Focus on Deaf Artists, which brought together other painters, dancers, and artists contributing to deaf culture.

In 2009 she was awarded the  Alice Cogswell Award for service to deaf people.

Death and legacy 
Miller died on December 3, 2012, of sepsis, which led to kidney failure. She was survived by her partner of 25 years, Nancy Creighton.

The Betty G. Miller Fellowship Award was named in her honor; it provides financial assistance to deaf women pursuing doctorate degrees at Gallaudet University.

Published works 
  Doctoral thesis.

References

Further reading

External links 
 Betty G. Miller
 Betty G. Miller: Deaf Painter

1934 births
2012 deaths
Deaths from sepsis
American LGBT artists
American women painters
Gallaudet University alumni
Place of death missing
Deaf artists
Artists from Chicago
Painters from Washington, D.C.
LGBT people from Illinois
American deaf people
21st-century LGBT people
21st-century American women